Soya may refer to:

Food
 Soya bean, or soybean, a species of legume native to East Asia, widely grown for its edible bean
 Soya sauce, see soy sauce, a fermented sauce made from soybeans, roasted grain, water and salt

Places
 Sōya District, Hokkaido, a district located in the Sōya Subprefecture, Hokkaido, Japan
 Sōya Subprefecture, a subprefecture of the Hokkaido Prefecture, Japan
 Sōya Main Line, a railway line in Hokkaido, Japan

Ships
 Japanese cruiser Soya, originally the Russian cruiser Varyag, launched 1900
 Sōya (icebreaker), a Japanese icebreaker
 , a Swedish coastal tanker

People
 Soya (singer) (born 1990), South Korean singer
 Carl Erik Soya (1896–1983), Danish author and dramatist
 Willi Soya (1935–1990), German footballer
 Yelena Soya (born 1981), Russian synchro-swimmer

Geographical features
 Sōya Strait, or La Pérouse Strait, the strait between Hokkaido, Japan, and Sakhalin, Russia
 Cape Sōya, situated in Wakkanai, the northernmost point of the island of Hokkaido, Japan

Other uses
 Soya Group, a Swedish corporate group including the Wallenius Lines, Wallfast and Wallenius Water companies
 Soya3D, a high-level three-dimensional rendering engine for the Python programming language

See also

 
 
 Soy (disambiguation)
 Soja (disambiguation)
 Soia (disambiguation)
 Soi (disambiguation)
 SOJ (disambiguation)